Magnolia is a historic plantation house located near Scotland Neck, Halifax County, North Carolina. It was built about 1840, and is a two-story, five bay, Greek Revival-style frame dwelling with rear additions.  It is sheathed in weatherboard, a hipped roof with interior chimneys, and full-width front porch.  The house was originally set in a formal landscape designed by Joseph B. Cheshire.

It was listed on the National Register of Historic Places in 1980.

References

Plantation houses in North Carolina
Houses on the National Register of Historic Places in North Carolina
Greek Revival houses in North Carolina
Houses completed in 1840
Houses in Halifax County, North Carolina
National Register of Historic Places in Halifax County, North Carolina